The Thailand Masters is an international badminton tournament held starting from 2016. The tournament is launched to honor Princess Sirivannavari, who was a former badminton player. Currently, the level of the tournament is BWF World Tour Super 300, replacing the older structure of Grand Prix Gold. The first tournament was held in Bangkok and offered a total prize money of US$120,000, until 2018 it increased to US$150,000.

Past winners

Performances by countries

References

 
2016 establishments in Thailand
Badminton
Badminton
BWF World Tour
January sporting events
Recurring sporting events established in 2016
Badminton
Badminton in Bangkok
Badminton tournaments in Thailand